The MV Klahowya is an  that was operated by Washington State Ferries.

The Klahowya served nearly all of her career on the Fauntleroy-Vashon-Southworth run before being moved to the San Juans to replace her sister ship, which was to be retired. In early 2008, and again in August 2012, she did short stints on the Inter-Island run due to a vessel shortage. She was moved to the Inter-Island route on June 30, 2014 and remained there until her retirement in 2017. She is currently moored in Eagle Harbor, Bainbridge Island. 

Klahowya is Chinook for "Greetings."

References

Washington State Ferries vessels
1958 ships
Ships built in Tacoma, Washington